George Alfred Taylor (November 9, 1903 - March 13, 1978) was an American prelate who served as the sixth Bishop of Easton between 1967 and 1975.

Early life and education
Taylor was born on November 9, 1903, in Hazardville, Connecticut, the son of Frank Webb Taylor and Maude Mary Evans. He was educated at the public secondary school in Springfield, Massachusetts, and later studied at Springfield College from where he graduated with a Bachelor of Arts in 1925. Later he was admitted to the Yale Divinity School from where he gained his Master of Divinity in 1928, after which he pursued a year of postgraduate study at General Theological Seminary. In 1946 he gained a Master of Arts from Bethany College. He was awarded a Doctor of Divinity from General Theological Seminary in 1967.

Ordained Ministry
Taylor was ordained deacon in June 1928 by Bishop G. Ashton Oldham and priest in May 1929 by Bishop Thomas Frederick Davies Jr. of Western Massachusetts. He then became curate at Grace Church in New York City. In 1929 he became rector of St Philip's Church in Easthampton, Massachusetts, and in 1932 transferred to Albany, New York, to become rector of St Paul's Church. Between 1947 and 1959 he served as rector of St David's Church in Baltimore, Maryland. In 1959, he was appointed dean of the Northern Convocation in the Diocese of Easton and rector of St Paul's Church in Fairlee, Maryland.

Bishop
Taylor was elected Bishop of Easton on the third ballot at a special convention on September 21, 1966. He was consecrated in Christ Church, Easton, Maryland, on December 21, 1966, by Presiding Bishop John E. Hines. He succeeded as bishop on January 1, 1967, and was installed in Trinity Cathedral on January 5, 1967. Taylor retired in 1975. He was a trustee at the Episcopal Theological Seminary and a member of the Yale Alumni Association of Maryland. He died in Alexandria, Virginia, on March 13, 1978.

Family
Taylor married Alice Tucker Jones, June 28, 1933, and together had two sons. After her death in 1969, he married Ann Gary on June 12, 1971.

References 

1903 births
1978 deaths
People from Enfield, Connecticut
Springfield College (Massachusetts) alumni
Yale Divinity School alumni
General Theological Seminary alumni
Bethany College (West Virginia) alumni
20th-century American Episcopalians
Episcopal bishops of Easton
20th-century American clergy